, also known as simply Polyphonica, is a Japanese all-age visual novel created by Ocelot and first released for Windows on April 28, 2006. Aside from the game, multiple series of light novels have been created, and a manga adaptation started in March 2007. An anime adaptation that aired in Japan between April to June 2007. Another anime adaption aired from April to June 2009, and was a prequel of the events in the first anime.

The original game, the Crimson series, will start its second installment, covering the third and fourth story. The Black and White Polyphonica series were adapted from a printed novel to visual novel media in spring 2007, respectively titled Shinkyoku Sōkai Polyphonica THE BLACK and Shinkyoku Sōkai Polyphonica Memories White.

Plot
 
In the continent of Polyphonica, spirits materialize in the world, surviving on the music that is played by humans, and live together with them. While the spirits do not appear often, some spirits have enough power to materialize in human or animal forms. Musicians called  play  using special instruments called  which enable the spirits they have partnered with to manifest their true powers. The Crimson series follows the adventures of a Dantist named Tatara Phoron and his contract spirit Coathicarte Apa Lagranges (Coatie). The second television series, Polyphonica Crimson S, takes place when they are still in school.

Release history
There have been five Shinkyoku Sōkai Polyphonica visual novels released, with three different series.

 Polyphonica Crimson series
 Shinkyoku Sōkai Polyphonica ~Episode 1&2 Box Edition~ – April 28, 2006
 Shinkyoku Sōkai Polyphonica ~Episode 3&4 Box Edition~ – May 25, 2007

 Polyphonica Black series
 Shinkyoku Sōkai Polyphonica THE BLACK ~Episode 1&2 Box Edition~ – August 10, 2007

 Polyphonica White series
 Shinkyoku Sōkai Polyphonica Memories White ~First Emotion~ – June 29, 2007
 Shinkyoku Sōkai Polyphonica Memories White ~Endless Aria~ – July 13, 2007

Adaptations

Light novels
After the game, the Polyphonica series expanded into a light novel series. The stories are loosely connected in a shared universe setting.  The novels are published by GA Bunko, a division of Softbank Creative. Some of the series are identified with colors. The Black series happens in the same timeline as the Crimson series, which follows the main characters of the game. The White series appears to take place in the distant past.

Polyphonica Crimson series
Story: Ichirō Sakaki / Illustrations: Noboru Kannatsuki
 Wayward Crimson - January 15, 2006
 Romantic Crimson - May 15, 2006 
 Spurting Crimson - September 15, 2006 
 Struggle Crimson - October 15, 2006
 Beginning Crimson - May 15, 2007
 Jealous Crimson - July 15, 2008
 Aiding Crimson - September 15, 2008
 Chasing Crimson - April 15, 2009
 Nostalgic Crimson - October 16, 2010
 Lookback Crimson - July 16, 2011
 Deciding Crimson - November 15, 2012
 Final Rising Crimson - June 15, 2013

 Polyphonica Crimson S series
 Story: Ichirō Sakaki / Illustrations: Noboru Kannatsuki
 Crimson S (1) - November 15, 2008
 Crimson S (2) - January 15, 2009
 Crimson S (3) - March 15, 2009
 Crimson S (4) - June 15, 2009
 Crimson S (5) - September 15, 2009
 Crimson S (6) - March 16, 2010

 Polyphonica After School series
 Story: Ichirō Sakaki / Illustrations: Noboru Kannatsuki
 After School 1 - July 17, 2012
 After School 2 - October 17, 2012
 After School 3 - March 16, 2013

Polyphonica Black series
Story: Junichi Ōsako / Illustrations: BUNBUN
 Inspector Black - June 15, 2006 
 Silent Black - August 15, 2006 
 Player Black - December 15, 2006
 Triangle Black - March 15, 2007
 Resolution Black - July 15, 2007
 Patient Black - October 12, 2007
 Memo Wars Black - February 15, 2008
 Reliance Black - July 15, 2008
 Isolation Black - October 15, 2008
 Liberation Black - January 15, 2009
 Addration Black - May 15, 2009
 Promist Black - August 15, 2009
 Advent Black - November 15, 2009
 InterLude Black - October 16, 2010

Polyphonica Leon series
Story: Junichi Ōsako  / Illustrations: Shinobu Shoryu
 Leon the Resurrector 1 - November 30, 2007
 Leon the Resurrector 2 - May 15, 2008
 Leon the Resurrector 3 - November 15, 2008
 Leon the Resurrector 4 - April 15, 2009

 Polyphonica Gold series
Story: Junichi Ōsako  / Illustrations: Shinobu Shoryu
 Leon the Gold - October 15, 2009

Polyphonica White series
Story: Madoka Takadono / Illustrations: Kinako Hiro
Eternal White - July 15, 2006
Infinity White - November 15, 2006
Missing White - April 15, 2007
 Anniversary White - September 15, 2007
 Ancient White - September 11, 2008
 Spiral White - December 15, 2008
 Marginal White - March 15, 2009
 Memories White - June 15, 2009
 Purely White - February 15, 2010
 Reunion White - July 15, 2010
 Regret White - November 15, 2010
 Wizout White - May 15, 2011
 Never Ending White - November 15, 2011

Polyphonica Blue series
Story:  Toshihiko Tsukiji / Illustrations: Eiji Usatsuka
 Excite Blue - February 15, 2007 
 Fugitive Blue - June 15, 2007
 Confusion Blue - August 15, 2009

Polyphonica Dan Sariel series
Story: Toshihiko Tsukiji / Illustrations: Kazuaki
 Dan Sariel and the White Silver Tiger - September 15, 2008
 Dan Sariel and the Magician of Hydra - April 15, 2009
 The Quartet of Midnight with Dan Sariel - July 15, 2010

Polyphonica Eiphonic Songbird series
Story: Ichirō Sakaki / Illustrations: Cantok
 May 15, 2012
 August 11, 2012
 March 15, 2014
 April 15, 2014

Short stories and anthology
 Marble - January 15, 2007
 Marble 2 - January 15, 2008
 Palette - August 10, 2007

Manga
Written by Ichiro Sakaki and illustrated by Tomo Hirokawa, a manga series adaptation entitled  began serialization as a web comic on March 2007 in FlexComix Blood and ended in 2012. It was collected in nine volumes. The series was picked up for an English release by CMX Manga, with the first volume released on June 29, 2010. They did not release others. Tomo Hirokawa designed a New Year's nengajō for 2008.

The Black series was adapted into a manga series illustrated by Yonemura Koichiro as a web comic and was serialized from December 2008 to 2011 in Flex Comix Next. It was compiled into three volumes.

The White series was adapted into a manga series illustrated by Yoko Fujioka and was serialized from April 2008 to 2011 in Monthly Princess. It was compiled into five volumes.

Anime

T.O Entertainment adapted Shinkyoku Sōkai Polyphonica into a twelve episode anime series directed by Junichi Watanabe and Masami Shimoda and written by Ichiro Sakaki. On February 6, 2007, one month after the first manga adaptation was announced, the anime adaptation was announced. Broadcast on TBS, the series premiered on April 3, 2007 and aired weekly until its conclusion on June 19, 2007. The music was composed by Hikaru Nanase. Two pieces of theme music were used for the anime. "Apocrypha" is performed by eufonius as the opening theme.  is performed by kukui as the ending theme.

Diomedéa adapted the series into another season entitled Shinkyoku Sōkai Polyphonica Crimson S, directed by Toshimasa Suzuki and written by Ken'ichi Kanemaki, that is not a continuation of the first and will tie into Ichiro Sakaki and Noboru Kannatsuki's light novel adaptation of the same name. The official website was launched on November 11, 2008 and began streaming a promotional video on March 23, 2009 featuring the anime's opening theme but contained no actual anime footage. The series premiered on TVK and TV Saitama on March 4, 2009 and is currently broadcasting weekly. The series was also broadcast on AT-X, Gifu Broadcasting, MBS, and Mie TV. The music is directed by Jin Aketagawa and composed by Magic Capsule. Two pieces of theme music were used for the anime. "Phosphorous" is performed by eufonius as the opening theme.  is performed by Haruka Tomatsu as ending theme.

North American releases
The Shinkyoku Sōkai Polyphonica anime series was licensed for distribution in North America by Sentai Filmworks. A DVD collection of all 12 episodes, in Japanese language with English subtitles, titled Polyphonica: Complete Collection, was released on November 17, 2009. The second season prequel series Shinkyoku Sōkai Polyphonica Crimson S was licensed for distribution in North America by Maiden Japan. A complete DVD collection titled Polyphonica Crimson S, containing all 12 episodes, in Japanese language with English subtitles, was released on April 3, 2012. Both seasons of the anime series have been posted on the Anime Network website for online streaming.

Role-playing game
A Shinkyoku Sōkai Polyphonica RPG, published by GA Bunko, went on sale in Japan in August 2008. The game is designed by Takashi Osada and FarEast Amusement Research, and uses the Standard RPG System. The campaign setting is based mainly on Polyphonica Crimson series.

Music
Crimson Series
Theme song: "Crimson Calling" by Rita (Ep 1 & 2)
"Crimson Calling (Ending Ver.)" by Rita (Ep 3 & 4)

Insert song: "Song of Wave" by Yuiko (Ep 3&4)

Ending theme: "Crimson Reason" by Rita (Ep 3 & 4)

Black Series
Theme song: "Hurting Heart" by fripSide

White Series
Theme song:  by Eri Kitamura

CDs
Opening Single: "Apocrypha" by eufonius - April 25, 2007
Ending Single:  by kukui - May 23, 2007
Game Original Soundtrack: May 25, 2007
Anime Original Soundtrack - Atmosphere: June 27, 2007, composed by Hikaru Nanase

Notes

References

External links

 Games
 Ocelot official website  – has links to Polyphonica games
 Official Polyphonica Crimson Episode 1&2 game website 
 Official Polyphonica Crimson Episode 3&4 game website 
 Official Polyphonica Black Series game website 
 Official Polyphonica White Series game website 
 Shinkyoku Sōkai Polyphonica RPG official site 

 Novels and Manga
 Manga website at FlexComix

 Anime
 
 
 Polyphonica @ TBS 
 Official Polyphonica Crimson S TV website  

2006 Japanese novels
2006 video games
2007 video games
Anime television series based on video games
Diomedéa
Fantasy anime and manga
GA Bunko
Ichirō Sakaki
Japan-exclusive video games
Light novels
Maiden Japan
Mainichi Broadcasting System original programming
Manga based on video games
Music in anime and manga
PlayStation 2 games
PlayStation Portable games
Romance anime and manga
Romance video games
Shōnen manga
Sentai Filmworks
TBS Television (Japan) original programming
Video games developed in Japan
Visual novels
Windows games
Prototype (company) games